Smoke Stack is a studio album by American jazz pianist Andrew Hill, recorded in 1963 and released in 1966 on Blue Note Records. It was his second recording as leader on the label. "Ode to Von" is dedicated to saxophonist Von Freeman, whilst "Verne" is dedicated to Hill's first wife, Laverne Gillette. 30 Pier Ave. is the address of The Lighthouse, a jazz club in Hermosa Beach, CA. The album is notable for the participation of acoustic bassists Richard Davis and Eddie Khan, who play simultaneously throughout. Drummer Roy Haynes returns from Hill’s previous sessions.

Track listing
All compositions by Andrew Hill
 "Smoke Stack" - 5:00
 "The Day After" - 5:07
 "Wailing Wail" - 5:46
 "Ode to Von" - 4:29  
 "Not So" - 6:24
 "Verne" - 5:48
 "30 Pier Avenue" - 7:06

Bonus tracks on CD:

Personnel
Andrew Hill - piano
Richard Davis - bass
Eddie Khan - bass
Roy Haynes - drums

References

1966 albums
Andrew Hill albums
Blue Note Records albums
Albums produced by Alfred Lion
Post-bop albums
Avant-garde jazz albums
Albums recorded at Van Gelder Studio